William English (died 1778) was an Irish poet.

English was a native of Newcastle West, County Limerick. After teaching schools at Castletownroche and Charleville, he finally entered the Augustinian order. He died at Cork on 13 January 1778 and was buried in St. John's churchyard. As a Gaelic poet of humble life English acquired considerable reputation. His best-known ballad, "Cashel of Munster", was translated by Sir Samuel Ferguson in Lays of the Western Gael (1865), pp. 209–10.

References

Year of birth missing
1778 deaths
18th-century Irish-language poets
Writers from County Limerick
Augustinian friars
Irish male poets
Irish educators
18th-century Irish educators
18th-century Irish male writers